Kharai-ye Pain (also Romanized as Kharā’ī-ye Pā’īn; also known as Kharā’ī) is a village in Ahmadi Rural District, Ahmadi District, Hajjiabad County, Hormozgan Province, Iran. At the 2006 census, its population was 86, in 20 families.

References 

Populated places in Hajjiabad County